This article contains information about the town of Berazategui. See also Berazategui Partido for the wider neighbourhood.

Berazategui is a city in Buenos Aires Province, Argentina, located to the south-east of Quilmes. It is the head town of the Berazategui Partido. It is part of the Gran Buenos Aires metropolitan area.

The city has the nickname "Capital Nacional del Vidrio" (National Capital of Glass), because of the high concentration of glassmaking industries in the area.

External links

 Guia comercial de Juan María Gutiérrez

 Berazategui website

 
Populated places in Buenos Aires Province
Populated places established in 1856
Cities in Argentina
Argentina